Antioch Christian Church is a historic Disciples of Christ church located near Allendale, Allendale County, South Carolina. It was built about 1835, and is a one-story, meeting house style clapboard structure with a hipped roof. The church was renovated in 1976. Included within the acreage is a cemetery where many of Allendale's oldest families are buried.

Dr. William Erwin, the original owner of Erwinton, his wife and sister-in-law were all excommunicated from Kirkland Church in 1833 for their affiliation with other denominations. They then formed the second Christian congregation, the Disciples of Christ, in South Carolina. They held weekly meetings at Erwinton until 1835 when Antioch Christian Church was completed and dedicated.

It was added to the National Register of Historic Places in 1977.

References

Christian Church (Disciples of Christ)
Churches in South Carolina
Churches on the National Register of Historic Places in South Carolina
Churches completed in 1835
19th-century churches in the United States
Buildings and structures in Allendale County, South Carolina
National Register of Historic Places in Allendale County, South Carolina